John Paul the Great Catholic University (JPCatholic) is a private Roman Catholic university in Escondido, California. It offers Bachelor of Science degrees and a Bachelor of Arts degree.

History 
John Paul the Great Catholic University was founded in 2003 under the name "New Catholic University."  After the death of Pope John Paul II in April 2005, the Board of Trustees decided to change the name to honor the late Pope, while retaining the word "Catholic" in the official name to emphasize the priorities of the school.  JPCatholic officially opened its doors with its first classes on September 21, 2006, with a temporary campus in Scripps Ranch.  The university moved to a permanent campus in Escondido in 2013, holding its first classes there at the start of the Fall 2013 academic quarter.

Campus 

Classrooms, sound stage, and chapel are located in a former Mingei art museum on Grand Avenue, the heart of Escondido's historic downtown, while administrative offices are housed in a building across the street. In early 2016, the university purchased a long-vacant furniture store with the intent to renovate the space "to house a huge sound stage, a library and an auditorium." The school has also purchased the campus of the defunct Center City High School to serve as the campus chapel.

Academics 

JPCatholic operates on a non-traditional year-round schedule, with three 10-week quarters per academic year and four quarters per calendar year.  Students graduate in three years, beginning the program at the start of a fall quarter and graduating at the end of their third summer quarter.  Consequently, there are never more than three "academic classes" of students on campus at any given time.

Undergraduate degrees 
JPCatholic currently offers two Bachelor of Science degrees, one in Business and one in Communications Media, along with a Bachelor of Arts in Humanities. The Communications Media degree program can be paired with an emphasis, such as film production and directing, graphic design, animation, or screenwriting. Undergraduate students also take core curriculum classes in philosophy, literature, business mathematics, and humanities, with a heavy emphasis on Scripture and Catholic theology. Over 75% of students major in Communications Media with one of the various emphases.

Senior Business Plan
JPCatholic is noted for its focus on business entrepreneurship, and offers an educational track and resource hub for entrepreneurial students, called the Business Launchpad.  Seniors business students work with business-experienced faculty to develop viable business plans, and use University resources to launch a company.

Rankings 
U.S. News & World Report 2020 ranks the school as #16 (out of 109 schools listed) in its "Regional Colleges West" category, these being "colleges which focus on undergraduate education that grant fewer than half their degrees in liberal arts disciplines." This category is not to be confused with Regional Universities West (128 schools), which "offer a full range of undergraduate programs and some master's programs but few doctoral programs", or National Liberal Arts Colleges (223 schools), which "emphasize undergraduate education and award at least half of their degrees in the liberal arts fields of study."

The university is ranked among the "Absolute Worst Campuses for LGBTQ Youth" in the US by Campus Pride. It was granted an exception to Title IX in 2016 which legally allows it to decline LGBT students for religious reasons.

Accreditation

JPCatholic is accredited by the Western Association of Schools and Colleges Senior College and University Commission.

References

External links
 Official website

Universities and colleges in San Diego County, California
Catholic universities and colleges in California
Education in Escondido, California
Educational institutions established in 2003
2003 establishments in California